Cataract surgery, also called lens replacement surgery, is the removal of the natural lens of the eye (also called "crystalline lens") that has developed an opacification, which is referred to as a cataract, and usually its replacement with an artificial intraocular lens.

Metabolic changes of the crystalline lens fibers over time lead to the development of the cataract, causing impairment or loss of vision. Some infants are born with congenital cataracts, and certain environmental factors may also lead to cataract formation. Early symptoms may include strong glare from lights and small light sources at night, and reduced visual acuity at low light levels.

During cataract surgery, the cloudy natural lens is removed, either by emulsification in place or by cutting it out. An artificial intraocular lens (IOL) is usually implanted in its place to restore useful focus. Cataract surgery is generally performed by an ophthalmologist in an out-patient setting at a surgical center or hospital. Local anaesthesia is normally used, and the procedure is usually quick and causes little or no pain and minor discomfort to the patient. Recovery sufficient for most daily activities usually takes place in a matter of days, and full recovery about a month.

Well over 90% of operations are successful in restoring useful vision, with a low complication rate. Day care, high volume, minimally invasive, small incision phacoemulsification with quick post-operative recovery has become the standard of care in cataract surgery all over the developed world. Manual small incision cataract surgery (MSICS) is popular in the developing world, as it is considerably more economical in time, capital equipment and consumables, while providing comparable results. Both procedures are low risk for serious complications.

Uses

Cataract surgery is the surgical removal of a lens of the eye as definitive treatment for vision impairment due to lens opacification. The procedure usually includes insertion of a prosthetic intraocular lens to restore focus within a useful range of distances.

A cataract is a cloudy area in the lens of the eye that causes a visual impairment. Cataracts usually develop slowly and can affect one or both eyes. Symptoms may include faded colours, blurry or double vision, halos around lights, sensitivity to glare from bright lights, and night blindness. This may result in difficulty driving, reading, or recognizing faces. Poor vision caused by cataracts may also increase the risk of falling and depression.

Cataracts are most commonly due to aging but may also be caused by trauma or radiation exposure, be present from birth, or occur following eye surgery for other problems. Risk factors include diabetes, longstanding use of corticosteroid medication, smoking tobacco, prolonged exposure to sunlight, alcohol. and extended hyperbaric oxygen therapy. The underlying mechanism involves accumulation of clumps of protein or yellow-brown pigment in the lens that reduces transmission of light to the retina at the back of the eye. Diagnosis is by an eye examination.

Early symptoms may be improved with glasses. If this does not help, surgery to remove the cloudy lens and replace it with an artificial lens is the only effective treatment. Cataract surgery is not readily available in many countries, and is needed only if the cataracts are causing problems. Surgery with implants generally results in better vision and an improved quality of life.

About 20 million people worldwide are blind due to cataracts. Cataracts cause 51% of all cases of blindness and 33% of visual impairment worldwide. They are the cause of approximately 5% of blindness in the United States and nearly 60% of blindness in parts of Africa and South America. Blindness from cataracts occurs in about 10 to 40 per 100,000 children in the developing world, and 1 to 4 per 100,000 children in the developed world. Cataracts become more common with age. In the United States, cataracts occur in 68% of those over the age of 80 years. They are more common in women, and less common in Hispanic and Black people.

Contraindications

Contraindications to cataract surgery include cataracts that do not cause visual impairment, and medical conditions that predict a high risk of unsatisfactory surgical outcomes.

Implantation of posterior chamber intraocular lens (PCIOL) in patients below 7 months of age is controversial due to rapid ocular growth at this age. Ocular growth in infants is not entirely predictable, and an early implant is likely to result in large refractive error later in childhood. Congenital cataracts may also be caused by factors which make the eye more susceptible to an excessive amount of inflammation, which may be very difficult to control. Intraocular lenses are associated with a greater risk of visual axis opacities in this age group. Optical correction in these patients without intraocular lens (aphakic) is usually managed with either special contact lenses or glasses. Secondary implantation of IOL (placement of a lens implant as a second operation) may be considered later.

Technique

Two main types of surgical procedures are in common use throughout the world. The first procedure is phacoemulsification (phaco), a method in which the lens is broken into small pieces which are removed by suction,  and the second involves two types of extracapsular cataract extraction (ECCE), in which the lens is removed from its capsule and removed in one piece or a small number of relatively substantial pieces. In most surgeries, an intraocular lens is inserted. Foldable lenses are generally used for the 2–3 mm phaco incision, while non-foldable lenses can be placed through the larger extracapsular incision. The small incision size used in phacoemulsification generally allows sutureless incision closure. ECCE uses a larger incision of 10–12 mm and therefore usually requires stitches, and this in part led to the modification of ECCE known as manual small incision cataract surgery (MSICS), which does not usually need stitches.

Cataract surgery using intracapsular cataract extraction (ICCE) has been superseded by phacoemulsification and MSICS, and is rarely performed. ECCE has largely become a contingency procedure to deal with complications during surgery.

Phacoemulsification is the most commonly performed cataract procedure in the developed world. However, the high capital and maintenance costs of a phacoemulsification machine and of the associated disposable equipment has the consequence that ECCE and MSICS remain the most commonly performed procedures in developing countries.

Cataract surgery is commonly done as day care rather than in-patient procedure as it is cheaper than hospitalisation and overnight stay, and there is evidence that day surgery has similar medical outcomes.

Types of surgery 

There are two main types of surgical technique used in cataract surgery: Phacoemulsification and manual extraction.
 Phacoemulsification (phaco) is the most common technique used in developed countries. It involves the use of a machine with an ultrasonic handpiece equipped with a titanium or surgical steel tip which vibrates at ultrasonic frequency (commonly 40,000 Hz) to emulsify the lens tissue. A second  instrument (sometimes called a "cracker" or "chopper") may be used from a side port to facilitate breaking the hard cataract nucleus into smaller pieces. Fragmentation into smaller pieces makes emulsification, and the aspiration of cortical material (the soft part of the lens around the nucleus), easier. After phacoemulsification of the lens nucleus and cortical material is completed, a dual irrigation-aspiration (I-A) probe or a bimanual I-A system is used to remove the remaining peripheral cortical material.
 Femtosecond laser-assisted cataract surgery has been reported to be safe, and may have less adverse effect on the cornea and macula than manual phacoemulsification. The laser is used to make the corneal incision, the capsulotomy and to initiate lens fragmentation, which reduces the energy requirements for phacoemulsification. It offers high precision, effective lens fragmentation at lower power levels and good optical quality, but as of 2022 has not been shown to have significant visual, refractive or safety benefit over manual phacoemulsification, and it has a higher cost.
 Extracapsular cataract extraction (ECCE), also known as manual extracapsular cataract extraction, is the removal of almost the entire natural lens in one piece, while the elastic lens capsule (posterior capsule) is left intact to allow implantation of an intraocular lens. It involves manual expression of the lens through a large (usually 10–12 mm) incision made in the cornea or sclera. Although it requires a larger incision and the use of stitches, this method may be indicated for patients with very hard cataracts or other situations in which phacoemulsification is problematic. 
 The manual small incision cataract surgery (MSICS) technique is an evolution of ECCE where the entire lens is removed from the eye through a self-sealing scleral tunnel wound. A well-constructed scleral tunnel is held closed by internal pressure, is watertight, and does not require suturing. The "small" in the title refers to the wound being relatively smaller than in ECCE, although it is still markedly larger than a phaco wound. Head-to-head trials of MSICS vs phaco in dense cataracts have found no difference in outcomes, but shorter operating time and significantly lower costs with MSICS. MSICS has become the cataract surgery method of choice in the developing world, as it provides high quality outcomes with less surgically induced astigmatism than ECCE, no suture related problems, quick rehabilitation, and few post-operative visits. It is easy and fast to learn for the surgeon, cost effective, simple, and applicable to almost all types of cataract.

 Intracapsular cataract extraction (ICCE) is the removal of the lens and the surrounding lens capsule in one piece. The procedure has a relatively high rate of complications due to the large incision required and pressure placed on the vitreous body. It has therefore been largely superseded and is rarely performed in countries where operating microscopes and high-technology equipment are readily available. After lens removal by ICCE, an intraocular lens implant can be placed in either the anterior chamber or sutured into the ciliary sulcus.Cryoextraction is a technique used in ICCE in which the cataract is extracted using a  cryoprobe, the refrigerated tip of which adheres to the tissue of the lens at the contact point by freezing with a cryogenic substance such as liquid nitrogen, facilitating its removal. It may still be used for the removal of subluxated lenses.
Refractive lens exchange is effectively the same procedure used to replace a lens with high refractive error when other methods are not effective. There are risks in addition to cataract procedural risks. A related procedure is the implantation of phakic intraocular lenses in series with the natural lens to correct vision in cases of high refractive errors.

Ophthalmic viscosurgical devices 

Ophthalmic viscosurgical devices (OVDs) are a class of clear gel-like material used in cataract surgery to maintain the volume and shape of the anterior chamber of the eye, and protect the intraocular tissues during the procedure. They were originally called viscoelastic substances, or just viscoelastics. Their consistency allows the surgical instruments to move through them, but when there is low shear stress they do not flow, and retain their shape. OVDs are available in several formulations which may be combined or used individually as best suits the procedure, and are introduced into the anterior chamber at the start of the procedure, and removed at the end, when they are replaced by a buffered saline solution. The tendency of cohesive OVDs to adhere to themselves helps with removal.

Intraocular lenses 

After the removal of the cataract, an intraocular lens (IOL) is usually implanted into the eye, to provide refractive compensation for the lack of the natural lens. An IOL may be implanted either through a small incision (1.8 mm to 2.8 mm) when using a foldable IOL, or through a larger incision, when using a rigid poly(methyl methacrylate) (PMMA) lens. The foldable IOL, made of silicone, hydrophobic, or hydrophilic acrylic material of appropriate refractive power is folded either using a holder/folder, or a proprietary insertion device provided along with the IOL. The lens implant is inserted through the incision, usually into the capsular bag within the posterior chamber (in-the-bag implantation). Sometimes, a sulcus implantation (in front or on top of the capsular bag but behind the iris) may be required because of posterior capsular tears or because of zonulodialysis. This will require a modification of refractive power because of the more anterior placement on the optical axis.

Other designs of multifocal intraocular lens are also available, which focus light from distant as well as near objects, working with similar effect to bifocal or trifocal eyeglasses. Preoperative patient selection and good counselling is necessary to avoid unrealistic expectations and post-operative patient dissatisfaction, and possibly a requirement to replace the lens. Acceptability of these lenses has improved and studies have shown good results in patients selected for expected compatibility.

A model of accommodating lens has two hinged struts on opposite edges which displace the lens along the optical axis when an inward transverse force is applied to the haptic loops at the outer ends of the struts (the components transferring the movement of the contact points to the device), and it springs back when the force is reduced. It is implanted in the eye's lens capsule, where the contractions of the ciliary body which would focus the eye with the natural lens are used to focus the implant.

The intraocular lenses used in correcting astigmatism have different curvature on two orthogonal axes, as on the surface of a torus, and are called toric lenses. The STAAR Surgical Intraocular Lens was the first such lens developed in the United States and it may correct up to 3.5 diopters. A different model of toric lenses was created by Alcon and may correct up to 3 diopters of astigmatism. To achieve the most benefit from a toric lens, the surgeon must place the lens with the axes of curvature to suit the patient's astigmatism. Intraoperative aberrometry, can be used to assist the surgeon in toric lens placement and minimize astigmatic errors.

Monofocal intraocular lenses provide accurately focused vision at one distance only: far, intermediate, or near. Patients who are fitted with these lenses may need to wear eyeglasses or contact lenses for reading or using a computer. These lenses usually have uniform spherical curvature.

Cataract surgery may be performed to correct vision problems in both eyes, and in these cases, if both eyes are suitable, patients are usually advised to consider monovision. This procedure involves inserting in one eye an intraocular lens that provides near vision and in the other eye an IOL that provides distance vision. Although most patients can adjust to having implanted monofocal lenses with differing focal length, some cannot compensate and may experience blurred vision at both near and far distances. An IOL optimised for distance vision may be combined with an IOL that optimises intermediate vision instead of near vision as a variation of monovision.

The first aspheric IOLs were developed in 2004. They provide better contrast sensitivity by having their periphery flatter than the middle of the lens. The effectiveness of aspheric IOLs depends on a range of conditions, and they may not always provide significant benefit.

Some IOLs provide ultraviolet and high energy blue light absorbption. The natural crystalline lens of the eye filters these potentially harmful frequencies. A Cochrane review of 2018 found that there is unlikely to be a significant difference in distance vision between blue-filtering and plain lenses, and were unable to identify a difference in contrast sensitivity or colour discrimination.

Another type of intraocular lens is the light-adjustable IOL, which was approved by the FDA in 2017. This particular type of IOL is implanted in the eye and then treated with ultraviolet light of a certain wavelength in order to alter the curvature of the lens.

In some cases, it may be necessary or desirable to insert an additional lens over the already implanted one, also in the posterior capsule. This type of IOL placement is called "piggyback" IOLs and is usually considered as an option when the visual outcome of the first implant is not optimal. In such cases, implanting another IOL over the existing one is considered safer than replacing the initial lens. This approach may also be used in patients who need high degrees of vision correction.

Whichever type is used, the appropriate refractive power of the IOL  must be selected, much like an eyeglass prescription, to provide the desired refractive outcome. Conventionally, preoperative measurements including corneal curvature, axial length, and white-to-white measurements are used to estimate the required power of the IOL. These methods include several formulas, including Hagis, Hoffer Q, Holladay 1, Holladay 2, and SRK/T. There are also free online calculators using similar input data. A history of LASIK surgery requires different calculations to take this into account. Refractive results using power calculation formulas based on pre-operative biometrics leave patients within 0.5D (diopters) of target (correlates to visual acuity of 6/7.5 (20/25) when targeted for distance) in 55% of cases and within 1D (correlates to 6/12 (20/40) when targeted for distance) in 85% of cases. Developments in intraoperative wavefront technology have demonstrated power calculations that provide improved outcomes, yielding 80% of patients within 0.5 diopters (7/7.5 (20/25) or better).

The cost is another important aspect of these lenses. Although most insurance companies cover the costs of monofocal IOLs, patients may have to pay the price difference if they choose more expensive lenses.

Preoperative evaluation
An eye examination or pre-operative evaluation by an eye surgeon is necessary to confirm the presence of a cataract and to determine if the patient is a suitable candidate for surgery. The patient must fulfill certain requirements such as:
 The degree of reduction of vision due, at least in large part, to the cataract should be evaluated. While the existence of other sight-threatening diseases, such as age-related macular degeneration or glaucoma, does not preclude cataract surgery, less improvement may be expected in their presence.
 The eyes should have a normal pressure, or any pre-existing glaucoma should be adequately controlled with medications. In cases of uncontrolled glaucoma, a combined cataract-glaucoma procedure (phaco-trabeculectomy) can be planned and performed.
 The pupil should be adequately dilated using eyedrops; if pharmacologic pupil dilation is insufficient, procedures for mechanical pupil dilatation may be needed during the surgery.
 Patients with retinal detachment may be scheduled for a combined vitreo-retinal procedure, along with PCIOL implantation.
 It has been shown that patients taking tamsulosin (Flomax), a common drug for enlarged prostate, are prone to developing a surgical complication known as intraoperative floppy iris syndrome (IFIS), which must be correctly managed to avoid the complication posterior capsule rupture; however, prospective studies have shown that the risk is greatly reduced if the surgeon is informed of the patient's history with the drug beforehand, and has appropriate alternative techniques prepared.
 A Cochrane Review of three randomized clinical trials including over 21,500 cataract surgeries examined whether routine preoperative medical testing resulted in a reduction of adverse events during surgery. Results showed that performing preoperative medical testing did not result in a reduction of risk of intraoperative or postoperative medical adverse events, compared to surgeries with no or limited preoperative testing.

Operation procedures

Antibiotics may be administered pre-operatively, intra-operatively, and/or post-operatively. Frequently a topical corticosteroid or nonsteroidal anti-inflammatory drug (NSAID) is used in combination with topical antibiotics post-operatively.

Most cataract operations are performed under a local anaesthetic, allowing the patient to go home the same day. The use of an eye patch may be indicated, usually for some hours and while sleeping, after which the patient is instructed to use anti-inflammatory eyedrops to control inflammation and antibiotic eyedrops to prevent infection. Lens and cataract procedures are commonly performed in an outpatient setting; in the United States, 99.9% of lens and cataract procedures were done in an ambulatory setting in 2012.

Occasionally, a peripheral iridectomy may be performed to minimize the risk of pupillary block glaucoma. An opening through the iris can be fashioned manually (surgical iridectomy) or with a laser (called Nd:YAG laser iridotomy). The laser peripheral iridotomy may be performed either prior to or following cataract surgery.

The iridectomy hole is larger when done manually than when performed with a laser. When the manual surgical procedure is performed, some negative side-effects may occur, such as that the opening of the iris can be seen by others (aesthetics), and the light can fall into the eye through the new hole, creating some visual disturbances. In the case of visual disturbances, the eye and brain often learn to compensate and ignore the disturbances over a couple of months. Sometimes the peripheral iris opening can heal, which means that the hole ceases to exist.

The two most commonly used procedures are phacoemulsification and manual small incision cataract surgery (MSICS). In either of these procedures it can sometimes be necessary to convert to ECCS to deal with a problem better managed through a larger incision.

Phacoemulsification

The surgical procedure in phacoemulsification for removal of cataract involves a number of steps, and is typically performed under an operating microscope. Each step must be correctly performed to achieve the desired result. The steps may be described as follows:
 Anaesthesia and pupil dilation; Either topical, sub-tenon, peribulbar, or retrobulbar local anaesthesia is used, usually causing little or no discomfort to the patient. Topical anaesthetic agents are most commonly used and may be placed on the globe of the eye as eyedrops prior to surgery and or in the globe during surgery. Local anaesthetic injection techniques include sub-conjunctival injections and or injections posterior to the globe (retrobulbar block) to produce a regional nerve block when it is necessary to prevent movement of the eye. Intravenous sedation may be combined with the topical and injection techniques. General anaesthesia and retrobulbar blocks were historically used for intracapsular cataract surgery, but for small incision surgery and phacoemulsification local and topical anaesthesia is in common use.
 Site preparation by disinfection of the area surrounding the eye, covering the rest of the face, and exposure of the eyeball using an eyelid speculum;
 Entry into the eye through a minimal incision; The incision for cataract surgery has evolved along with the techniques for cataract removal and IOL placement. In phacoemulsification the size depends on the requirements for IOL insertion. A more posterior incision simplifies wound closure and decreases induced astigmatism, but is more likely to damage blood vessels. With foldable IOLs it is sometimes possible to use incisions smaller than 3.5 mm. The shape, position and size of the incision all affect the capacity for self sealing, the tendency to induce astigmatism, and the surgeon's ability to maneuver instruments through the opening. One or two smaller side port incisions 60 to 90 degrees from the main incision may be needed to access the anterior chamber with additional instruments.
 Injection of ophthalmic viscosurgical devices, also known as viscoelastics, into the anterior chamber to support, stabilize and protect the eyeball, to help maintain eye shape and volume, and to distend the lens capsule during IOL implantation.
 Capsulorhexis; Making a circular opening on the front surface of the lens capsule to access the lens within. In phacoemulsification, an anterior continuous curvilinear capsulorhexis, is used to create a round and smooth edged opening through which the lens nucleus can be emulsified and the intraocular lens implant inserted.
 Hydrodissection; The cataract's outer (cortical) layer is separated from the capsule by a gentle continuous flow or pulsed dose of liquid from a cannula, injected under the anterior capsular flap along the edge of the capsulorhexis opening;
 Hydrodelineation; An injection of fluid into the body of the lens through the cortex against the nucleus of the cataract separates the hardened nucleus from the softer cortex shell by flowing along the interface between them. The smaller hard nucleus can then be more expeditiously phacoemulsified, while the posterior cortex serves as a buffer protecting the posterior capsule membrane. The smaller size of the separated nucleus requires less deep and less peripheral grooving and produces smaller fragments after cracking or chopping. The posterior cortex also maintains the shape of the capsule which reduces risk of posterior capsule rupture
 Ultrasonic destruction and aspiration of the cataract after nuclear cracking or chopping (if needed), careful aspiration of the remaining lens cortex (outer layer of lens) material from the capsular bag, and capsular polishing (the removal of all remaining epithelial cells from the capsule), if needed;
 Implantation of the folded intraocular replacement lens, usually into the remaining posterior capsule, and ensuring that it unfolds correctly. Aligning the IOL in the correct axis to counteract astigmatism is necessary for a toric IOL;
 Removal of ophthalmic viscosurgical devices; The viscoelastic that was injected to stabilize the anterior chamber, protect the cornea from damage, and distend the cataract's capsule during IOL implantation must be removed from the eye to prevent post-operative viscoelastic glaucoma (a severe intra-ocular pressure increase). This is done via suction from the irrigation-aspiration instrument and replacement by buffered saline solution (BSS). Removal of OVD from behind the implant reduces the risk and magnitude of postoperative pressure spikes or capsular distention;
 Wound sealing and hydration. The incision is sealed by elevating the pressure inside the globe with BSS which presses the internal tissue against the external tissue of the incision, holding the incision closed. If this does not achieve a satisfactory seal a suture may be added.

Manual small incision cataract surgery (MSICS)
Many of the steps are similar and some may be essentially the same as for phacoemulsification, and the main differences are related to the alternative method of incision and cataract extraction from the capsule and eye.
 Preparation may begin 3 to 7 days before surgery with the preoperative application of NSAIDs and antibiotic eye drops.
 The pupil is dilated using drops if the IOL is to be placed behind the iris to help better visualise the cataract. Pupil-constricting drops are reserved for secondary implantation of the IOL in front of the iris, when the cataract has already been removed without primary IOL implantation. Anaesthesia may be placed topically as eyedrops or via injection next to (peribulbar), or behind (retrobulbar) the eye, or sub-Tenons. Local anaesthetic nerve blocking has been recommended to facilitate surgery. Topical anaesthetics may be used at the same time as a intracameral lidocaine injection to reduce pain during the operation. Oral or intravenous sedation may also be used to reduce anxiety. General anaesthesia is rarely necessary, but may be used for children and adults with  medical or psychiatric issues affecting their ability to remain still during the procedure.
 The operation may occur on a stretcher or a reclining examination chair. The eyelids and surrounding skin are swabbed with a disinfectant, such as 10% povidone-iodine, and topical povidone-iodine is put in the eye. The face is covered with a cloth or sheet, with an opening for the operative eye. The eyelid is held open with a speculum to minimize blinking during surgery. Pain is usually minimal in properly anaesthetised eyes, though a pressure sensation and discomfort from the bright operating microscope light is common. The ocular surface is kept moist during the procedure using sterile saline eye drops or methylcellulose viscoelastic. Bridle sutures may be used to help to stabilize the eyeball during sclerocorneal tunnel incision and during extraction of the nucleus and epinucleus through the tunnel.
The small incision into the anterior chamber of the eye is made at or near the corneal limbus where the cornea and sclera meet, either superior or temporal. Advantages of the smaller incision include use of few or no stitches and shortened recovery time. The "small" incision is small in comparison with the earlier ECCE incision, but considerably larger than the phaco incision. The precise geometry of the incision is important as it affects the self-sealing of the wound and can cause astigmatism by distortion of the cornea during healing. A sclerocorneal or scleral tunnel incision is commonly used, which reduces induced astigmatism if suitably formed. A sclerocorneal tunnel is a three phase incision. It starts with a shallow incision perpendicular to the sclera, followed by an incision through the sclera and cornea approximately parallel to the outer surface, and then a beveled incision into the anterior chamber. This structure provides the self-sealing characteristic, as internal pressure presses the faces of the incision together.
 The depth of the anterior chamber and position of the posterior capsule may be maintained during surgery by ophthalmic viscosurgical devices or an anterior chamber maintainer, which is an auxiliary cannula providing a sufficient flow rate of BSS to keep the shape of the chamber and internal pressure stable.
 A capsulotomy, also known as a cystotomy, is made to open the surface of the lens capsule, using an instrument called a cystotome. The continuous curvilinear capsulorhexis technique is in common use. An anterior capsulotomy refers to the opening of the front portion of the lens capsule, necessary for access for removing the cataract, whereas a posterior capsulotomy refers to an opening of the back portion of the lens capsule, which is not usually necessary or desirable unless it has opacified.  The types of capsular openings commonly used in MSICS are the continuous curvilinear capsulorhexis,  the can-opener capsulotomy, and the envelope capsulotomy.
 Manual removal of the cataract lens from the capsule and anterior chamber. Hydroexpression, viscoexpression, or more direct mechanical methods may be used.
 Following cataract removal, an intraocular lens is usually inserted into the posterior capsule. When the posterior capsule is damaged, the IOL may be inserted into the ciliary sulcus, or a glued intraocular lens technique may be applied.
 After the IOL is inserted, the ophthalmic viscosurgery device is aspirated and replaced with BSS and the wound closed. The surgeon checks that the incision does not leak fluid, since wound leakage increases the risk of  microorganisms gaining access into the eye and predisposing it to endophthalmitis. An antibiotic/steroid combination eye drop is put in and an eye shield may be applied, sometimes supplemented with an eye patch.

Converting to ECCS to manage a contingency
Sometimes it can be necessary to change from a phacoemulsification procedure to ECCE if one of the following occur:
 A posterior capsule rupture or zonular dehiscence or a dropped nucleus with a nuclear fragment more than half the size of the cataract;
 Problematic capsulorhexis with a hard cataract;
 A very dense cataract, where phacoemulsification is likely to cause permanent damage to the cornea.
Similarly, there are occasions when it is appropriate to change from MSICS to ECCE:
 The nucleus turns out to be too large for the MSICS incision;
 During MSICS on a nanophthalmic eye, the nucleus is found to be deformed.

Complications
Complications can develop during and after surgery.

During surgery
 Posterior capsular rupture is the most common complication during cataract surgery, with a rate of  around 0.5% to 5.2%. This is a tear in the posterior capsule of the natural lens. Surgical management may involve anterior vitrectomy and, occasionally, alternative planning for implanting the intraocular lens, either in the ciliary sulcus, (the space between the iris and the ciliary body), in the anterior chamber (in front of the iris), or, less commonly, sutured to the sclera. Posterior capsule rupture can cause lens fragments to be retained, corneal oedema, and cystoid macular oedema. it is also associated with a six-times increase of risk of endophthalmitis and as much as 19 times increase in the risk of retinal detachment. Management methods include the Intraocular lens scaffold procedure.
 Suprachoroidal hemorrhage is a rare complication of intraocular surgery where the ciliary arteries bleed into the space between the choroid and the sclera. It is a potentially vision threatening pathology. Risk factors for suprachoroidal hemorrhage include anterior chamber intraocular lens (ACIOL), axial myopia, advanced age, atherosclerosis, glaucoma, systolic hypertension, tachycardia, uveitis, and previous ocular surgery. Immediate and effective management of a suprachoroidal hemorrhage is necessary to protect vision.
Intraoperative floppy iris syndrome has an incidence of around 0.5% to 2.0%.
 Iris or ciliary body injury  has an incidence of about 0.6%-1.2%
 Posterior dislocation of nuclear fragments: In the event of a posterior capsule rupture, fragments of the nucleus can find there way through the tear into the vitreous chamber. It is not always desirable to attempt to recover the fragments and it is rarely successful. The rest of the fragments should generally be stabilised first, and vitreous prevented from entering the anterior chamber. Removal of the fragments may be best referred to a vitreoretinal specialist.
 Failure to aspirate all lens fragments, leaving some in the anterior chamber.
 Incisional burns are caused by overheating of the phacoemulsification tip when ultrasonic power continues while the irrigation or aspiration lines are blocked, as the flow through these lines is used to keep the tip cool. Burns to the incision may make closure difficult and can cause corneal astigmatism.

After surgery
Complications after cataract surgery are relatively uncommon.
 Posterior vitreous detachment (PVD) does not directly threaten vision. Even so, it is of increasing interest because the interaction between the vitreous body and the retina might play a decisive role in the development of major pathologic vitreoretinal conditions. PVD may be more problematic with younger patients, since many patients older than 60 have already gone through PVD. PVD may be accompanied by peripheral light flashes and increasing numbers of floaters.

 Some people develop a posterior capsular opacification (PCO), also called an after-cataract. As a physiological change expected after cataract surgery, the posterior capsular cells undergo hyperplasia and cellular migration, showing up as a thickening, opacification and clouding of the posterior lens capsule (which is left behind when the cataract was removed, for placement of the IOL). This may compromise visual acuity and can be safely and painlessly corrected using a laser to a hole in the posterior lens capsule. It usually is a quick outpatient procedure that uses a Nd-YAG laser (neodymium-yttrium-aluminum-garnet) to clear the central portion of the opacified posterior pole of the capsule (posterior capsulotomy). This creates a clear central visual axis for improving visual acuity. In very thick opacified posterior capsules, a surgical (manual) capsulectomy may be needed. A posterior capsulotomy is a factor which must be taken in consideration in the event of IOL replacement as vitreous can migrate toward the anterior chamber through the opening previously occluded by the IOL. Posterior capsule opacification has an incidence of about 0.3% to 28.4%. 
 Retinal detachment normally occurs at a prevalence of 1 in 1,000 (0.1%), but patients who have had cataract surgery are at an increased risk (0.5–0.6%) of developing rhegmatogenous retinal detachment (RRD)the most common form of retinal detachment. Cataract surgery speeds up the rate of vitreous humor liquefaction and this leads to increased rates of RRD. When a retinal tear occurs, vitreous liquid enters the space between the retina and retinal pigmented epithelium (RPE) and presents as flashes of light (photopsia), dark floaters, and loss of peripheral vision.
 Toxic anterior segment syndrome or TASS is a non-infectious inflammatory condition that may occur following cataract surgery. It is usually treated with topical corticosteroids in high dosage and frequency.
 Endophthalmitis is a serious infection of the intraocular tissues, usually following intraocular surgery complications, or penetrating trauma, and one of the most severe. It is rare in cataract surgery due to the use of prophylactic antibiotics  There is some concern that the clear cornea incision might predispose to the increase of endophthalmitis but there is no conclusive study to corroborate this suspicion. An intracameral injection of antibiotics may be used as a preventive measure. A meta-analysis showed the incidence of endophthalmitis after phacoemulsification to be 0.092%. The risk is higher with diabetes, advanced age, larger incision procedures, and vitreous communication with the anterior chamber due to posterior capsule rupture, The risk of vitreous infection is at least six times higher than for the aqueous. Typical presentation is within two weeks after the procedure with decreased visual acuity, red-eye, and pain. Hypopyon occurs about 80% of the time. Common infective agents include coagulase-negative staphylococci and Staphylococcus aureus in about 80% of infections. Management includes vitreous humor tap and injection of broad-spectrum antibiotics. Outcomes can be severe even with treatment, and may range from permanently decreased visual acuity to no light perception, depending on the microbiological etiology.
 Glaucoma may occur and it may be very difficult to control. It is usually associated with inflammation, especially when little fragments or chunks of the nucleus get access to the vitreous cavity. Some experts recommend early intervention by posterior pars plana vitrectomy when this condition occurs. In most cases raised post-operative intraocular pressure is transient and benign, usually returning to baseline within 24 hours without intervention. Glaucoma patients may experience further visual field loss or a loss of fixation, and are more likely to experience intraocular pressure spikes. Secondary glaucoma is an important complication of surgery for congenital cataracts. It can occur several years after the cataract surgery, so these patients need lifelong surveillance.
Mechanical pupillary block; shallowing of the anterior chamber by obstruction of the flow of aqueous humor flow through the pupil by the vitreous face or IOL;
 Elevated intraocular pressure.
 Swelling of the central part of the retina, called the macula, resulting in macular oedema, can occur a few days or weeks after surgery. Most such cases can be successfully treated. Preventative use of nonsteroidal anti-inflammatory drugs has been reported to reduce the risk of macular oedema to some extent.
 Uveitis–glaucoma–hyphema syndrome: This is a complication caused by the mechanical irritation of a mispositioned intraocular lens over the iris, ciliary body or iridocorneal angle.
 Other possible complications include: Swelling or oedema of the cornea, sometimes associated with cloudy vision (pseudophakic bullous keratopathy), which may be transient or permanent. Displacement or dislocation of the intraocular lens implant may occur, but it is rare. Unplanned high refractive error (either myopic or hypermetropic) may occur due to error in the ultrasonic biometry (measurement of the eye length and calculation of the required intraocular lens power). Cyanopsia, in which the patient sees everything tinted with blue, often occurs for a few days, weeks or months after removal of a cataract. Floaters commonly appear after surgery.

It may be necessary to exchange, remove or reposition an IOL after surgery, for any of several possible reasons.
Capsular block syndrome, which is hyper-distention of the lens capsular bag due to the IOL blocking fluid from draining through the anterior capsulotomy. This may cause a myopic refractive error;
Chronic anterior uveitis, which is a persistent inflammation of the anterior segment;
Chronic loss of endothelial cells faster than the rate due to normal aging;
Iris pigment epithelium loss;
Pain;
Progressive elongation of the pupil in direction of the long axis of the IOL;
Progressive closing of the anterior chamber angle due to propagation of anterior synechiae without apparent anterior uveitis;
Incorrect IOL refractive power;
Incorrect positioning of the IOL, including decentering, tilt, or rotation that reduces correct function;
Damage or deformation of the IOL;
Unexpected optical results due to defects of the IOL;
Undesirable optical phenomena reported by the patient due to any other cause.

Risk
Statistically, cataract surgery and IOL implantation are procedures with the safest and highest success rates in eye care. However, as with any type of surgery, some level of risk remains.

As of 2011, cataract surgery is the most frequent surgical procedure in the United States, with 1.8 million Medicare beneficiaries undergoing the procedure in 2004. This rate is expected to increase as the population ages. Cataract surgery following modern procedures is safe and effective, but not entirely free of risk.

Most complications of cataract surgery do not result in long-term visual impairment, but there are some severe  complications that can result in irreversible blindness. A survey of adverse results affecting Medicare patients recorded between 2004 and 2006 showed an average rate of 0.5% for one or more severe post-operative complications, with the rate decreasing over the study period by about 20%. The most important risk factors identified were diabetic retinopathy, and a combination of cataract surgery with another intraocular procedure on the same day. 97% of the surgeries in the study were not combined with other intraocular procedures. 3% were combined with retinal, corneal or glaucoma surgery on the same day.

Recovery and rehabilitation

Side effects such as grittiness, watering, blurred vision, double vision or a red or bloodshot eye may occur, and will usually clear over a few days. Full recovery can take four to six weeks.

It is generally recommended to avoid getting water in the eye during the first week after surgery and to avoid swimming for two to three weeks as a conservative approach, to minimise risk of bacterial infection.

Most patients can return to normal activities the day following phacoemulsification surgery. Depending on the procedure, driving should be avoided for at least 24 hours after the surgery, largely due to effects from the anaesthesia, possible swelling affecting focus, and pupil dilation causing excessive glare. At the first post-operative check, the surgeon will usually be able to confirm whether vision is suitable for driving.

With small-incision self-sealing wounds used with phacoemulsification, some of the post-operative restrictions common with intracapsular and extracapsular procedures  are not relevant. Restrictions against lifting and bending were intended to reduce the risk of the wound opening, because straining increases intraocular pressure, but with a self-sealing tunnel incision, higher pressure closes the wound more tightly. Routine use of a shield is also usually not required because inadvertent finger pressure on the eye should not open a correctly structured incision, which should only open to point pressure.

The eyes should not be rubbed after surgery, as this can cause contamination, as can the use of eye makeup, face cream or lotions. Situations where there is a lot of dust, wind, pollen or dirt should also be avoided. Sunglasses should be worn on bright days as the eyes will be more sensitive to bright light for a while.

Topical anti-inflammatory drugs and antibiotics are commonly used in the form of eye-drops to reduce the risk of inflammation and infection. A shield or eye-patch may be prescribed to protect the eye while sleeping. The eye will be checked to ensure that the IOL remains in place, and once it has fully stabilised, after about six weeks, vision tests will be done to check whether prescription lenses are needed. Where the focal length of the IOL is optimised for distance vision, reading glasses will generally be needed for near focus.

In some cases the patient is dissatisfied with the optical correction provided by the initial implants, and removal and replacement is necessary. This can occur with the more complex designs of IOL when patient expectations do not match with the compromises inherent in these designs, or the patient cannot accommodate the difference in distance and near focusing of monovision lenses.

The patient should not participate in contact or extreme sports or similar activities until cleared to do so by the eye surgeon.

Outcomes

Visual acuity after full recovery depends on the underlying condition of the eye, the choice of IOL, and any long term complications associated with the surgery. Well over 90% of operations are successful in restoring useful vision, with a low complication rate.

The World Health Organisation recommends that at least 80% of eyes should have a presenting visual acuity of 6/6 to 6/18 (20/20 to 20/60) after surgery, which is considered a good visual outcome, and that with best correction this should be at least 90%. Acuity of between 6/18 and 6/60  (20/60 to 20/200) is regarded as borderline, and worse than 6/60 (20/200) is considered poor. Borderline or poor visual outcomes are usually due to pre-existing conditions such as glaucoma, macular disease or diabetic retinopathy.

A 10 year prospective survey on refractive outcomes from a UK National Health Service cataract surgery service from 2006 to 2016 showed a mean difference between the targeted and outcome refraction of −0.07 diopters, with a standard deviation of 0.67, a mean absolute error of 0.50 diopters.  88.76% were within 1 diopter of target refraction and 62.36% within 0.50 diopters.

In a 2009 study in Sweden, factors that affected predicted refraction error included sex, preoperative visual acuity, glaucoma, and other eye disease. Second eye surgery, macular degeneration, age, and diabetes did not affect predicted outcome. Prediction error decreased over time, which is likely to be due to the use of better equipment and techniques, including more accurate biometry.

An American survey of nearly two million bilateral cataract surgery patients published in 2013 found that immediate sequential bilateral cataract surgery  was statistically associated with worse visual outcomes than for delayed sequential bilateral cataract surgery, but the difference was small and may not be clinically relevant.

History
Cataract surgery has a long history in Europe, Asia and Africa. It is one of the most common and one of the most successful procedures in worldwide use. The success is due to a combination of improvements in techniques for cataract removal and  developments in intraocular lens replacement technology, both in the techniques for implantation, and the design, construction and selection of the IOL. Surgical techniques that have contributed to this success include microsurgery, viscoelastics,  and phacoemulsification.

Couching

Couching is the earliest documented form of cataract surgery, and one of the oldest surgical procedures. It is a technique whereby the lens is dislodged, and pushed aside, but not removed from the eye, thus removing the opacity, but also the ability to focus. Couching was used for centuries, but it has generally poor outcomes and is currently routinely practiced only in remote areas of developing countries.

Cataract surgery was first mentioned in the Babylonian code of Hammurabi .

The earliest known depiction of cataract surgery is on a statue from the Fifth Dynasty of Egypt. It is further alleged that a "relief painting from tomb number TT 217 in a worker settlement in Deir el-Medina" shows "the man buried in the tomb,  Ipuy,... one of the builders of royal tombs in the renowned Valley of the Kings, circa 1279–1213 BC" as he underwent cataract surgery. It is assumed that the couching technique was used.

Couching was practised in ancient India and subsequently introduced to other countries by the Indian physician Sushruta ( 6th century BCE), who described it in his work the Compendium of Sushruta or Sushruta Samhita. The Uttaratantra section of the Compendium, chapter 17, verses 55–69, describes an operation in which a curved needle was used to push the opaque "phlegmatic matter" (kapha in Sanskrit) in the eye out of the way of vision. The phlegm was then said to be blown out of the nose. The eye would later be soaked with warm clarified butter and then bandaged. Here is a translation from the original Sanskrit:

The removal of cataracts by surgery was introduced into China from India, and flourished in the Sui and Tang dynasties.

The first references to cataract and its treatment in Europe are found in 29 AD in De Medicina, the work of the Latin encyclopedist Aulus Cornelius Celsus, which describes a couching operation.

Galen of Pergamon , a prominent Greek physician, surgeon and philosopher, performed an operation to remove a cataract affected lens, using a needle-shaped instrument. Although many 20th century historians have claimed that Galen believed the lens to be in the exact center of the eye, there is evidence that he understood that the crystalline lens is located in the anterior aspect of the human eye.

The removal of cataracts by couching was a common surgical procedure in Djenné, as in many other parts of Africa.

Couching continued to be used throughout the Middle Ages and is still used in some parts of Africa and in Yemen. Couching is an ineffective and dangerous method of cataract therapy, and often results in patients remaining blind or with only partially restored vision. For the most part, it has been replaced by extracapsular cataract surgery, including phacoemulsification.

The lens can also be removed by suction through a hollow instrument. Such a procedure was described by the 10th-century Persian physician Muhammad ibn Zakariya al-Razi, who attributed it to Antyllus, a 2nd-century Greek physician. The procedure "required a large incision in the eye, a hollow needle, and an assistant with an extraordinary lung capacity". This suction procedure was also described by the Iraqi ophthalmologist Ammar Al-Mawsili, in his Choice of Eye Diseases, also written in the 10th century. He presented case histories of its use, claiming to have had success with it on a number of patients. Extracting the lens has the benefit of removing the possibility of the lens migrating back into the field of vision. A later variant of the cataract needle in 14th-century Egypt, reported by the oculist Al-Shādhili, used a screw to grip the lens. It is not clear how often, if ever, this method was used, as other writers, including Abu al-Qasim al-Zahrawi and Al-Shadhili, appear to have been unfamiliar with this procedure or claimed it was ineffective.

Eighteenth and nineteenth centuries 

In 1748, Jacques Daviel was the first modern European physician to successfully extract cataracts from the eye, removing the cataract from the capsule through a corneal incision with about 50% success rate. In 1753 the first recorded surgical removal of the entire lens and lens capsule was done by Samuel Sharp. The lens was removed from the eye through a limbal incision. In America, cataract couching may have been performed in 1611, and cataract extraction was most likely performed by 1776. Cataract extraction by aspiration of lens material through a tube to which suction is applied was performed by Philadelphia surgeon Philip Syng Physick in 1815.

King Serfoji II Bhonsle of Thanjavur in India performed cataract surgeries in the early 1800s, documented in manuscripts at the Saraswathi Mahal Library.

Twentieth century to present

At the beginning of the 20th century the standard procedure was intracapsular cataract extraction (ICCE). The work of Henry Smith was influential as he had developed a safe and fast way to remove the lens within its capsule by external manipulation. The capsule forceps, the discovery of enzymatic zonulysis by Joaquin Barraquer in 1957, and the introduction of cryoextraction of the lens by T. Krawicz and Charles Kelman in 1961 helped continue the development of ICCE. Inracapsular cryoextraction using a probe tip cooled by liquid nitrogen to freeze the encapsulated lens to the probe was the favored form of cataract extraction from the late 1960s to the early 1980s.

In 1949, Harold Ridley introduced the concept of implantation of the intraocular lens which made more efficient and comfortable visual rehabilitation possible after cataract surgery.

Artificial intraocular lenses (IOLs) are used to replace the eye's natural lens that is removed during cataract surgery. These lenses increased in popularity since the 1960s, but it was not until 1981 that the first U.S. Food and Drug Administration (FDA) approval for this type of product was issued. The development of IOLs was an innovation, as patients previously did not have their natural lens replaced and as a result had to wear very thick eyeglasses or a special type of contact lenses. IOLs can be selected to correct other vision problems, such as toric lenses for correcting astigmatism. IOLs can be classified as monofocal, toric, and multifocal lenses.
Also in the 1960s, the development of ultrasound A-scan biometry was a major advance in ocular biometry, which contributed towards accurate prediction of implant refractive strength.

In 1967, Charles Kelman introduced phacoemulsification, a technique that uses ultrasonic energy to emulsify the nucleus of the crystalline lens in order to remove the cataracts by aspiration without a large incision. This method of surgery decreased the need for an extended hospital stay and made out-patient surgery the standard. Patients who undergo cataract surgery hardly complain of pain or even discomfort during the procedure. However patients who have topical anaesthesia, rather than peribulbar block anaesthesia, may experience some discomfort.

Ophthalmic viscosurgical devices (OVDs) were introduced in 1972, and facilitated the procedure, as well as improving safety. An OVD is a viscoelastic solution, a gel-like substance used to maintain the shape of the eye at reduced pressure and to protect the inside structure and tissues of the eye without interfering with the operation.

In the early 1980s Danièle Aron-Rosa and colleagues introduced the neodymium:yttrium-aluminum-garnet laser|neodymium:yttrium-aluminum-garnet (Nd:YAG) laser for posterior capsulotomy.

In 1980 Colvard made the cataract incision in the sclera, which limited induced astigmatism.

Thomas Mazzocco developed the first foldable IOL and implanted it in 1985. Graham Barrett and associates pioneered the use of silicone, acrylics, and hydrogel lenses.

According to Cionni et al 2006, Kimiya Shimizu began removing cataracts using topical anaesthesia in the late 1980s, though Davis, 2016, attributes the introduction of topical anaesthetics to Fischman in 1993.

In 1987, Blumenthal and Moissiev described the use of a reduced incision size for ECCE, They used a 6.5 to 7 mm straight scleral tunnel incision 2 mm behind the limbus, with two side ports.

In 1989 McFarland introduced a self-sealing incision architecture, in 1990
Pallin described a chevron-shaped incision which induces the least astigmatism, and in 1991 Singer described the frown incision, where the ends curve away from the limbus, which produces reduced astigmatism, but more than the chevron.

Toric intraocular lenses were introduced in 1992 and are used worldwide to correct corneal astigmatism during cataract surgery. They have been FDA approved since 1998.

In the late 1990s, a further advance was made with optical biometry based on partial coherence infrared interferometry, which gives better resolution and much greater precision, and is also much quicker and more comfortable than ultrasound.

According to surveys of members of the American Society of Cataract and Refractive Surgery, approximately 2.85 million cataract procedures were performed in the United States during 2004 and 2.79 million in 2005.

In 2009 Kosakarn described a method for manual fragmentation of the lens called double-nylon loop. In this technique, the lens is divided into three pieces for extraction, allowing a smaller, sutureless incision of 4.0–5.0 mm,  and implantation of a foldable IOL. This technique used less expensive instruments and is suitable for use in developing countries.

As of 2013, instruments are available that use infra-red swept-source optical coherence tomography (SS-OCT), a non-invasive, high-speed method that can penetrate dense cataracts, and collects thousands of scans per second to generate high resolution 2- or 3-dimensional data.

As of 2021, approximately 4 million cataract procedures take place annually in the U.S. and nearly 28 million worldwide, a large proportion in India. That is about 75,000 procedures per day globally.

Regional practice and statistics

United Kingdom
In the UK the practice of the various National Health Service healthcare providers in referring people with cataracts to surgery varied widely as of 2017, with many of the providers only referring people with moderate or severe vision loss, and often with delays. This is despite guidance issued by the NHS executive in 2000 urging providers to standardize care, streamline the process, and increase the number of cataract surgeries performed in order to meet the needs of the aging population. The national ophthalmology outcomes audit in 2019 found five NHS trusts with complication rates between 1.5% and 2.1%, but since the first national cataract audit in 2010, there had been a 38% reduction in posterior capsule rupture complications.

Asia
South Asia has the highest global age-standardized prevalence of moderate to severe visual impairment (17.5%) and mild vision impairment (12.2%). The distribution of ophthalmologists ranges from more than 114 per million of population in Japan to 0 in Micronesia. Cataract has traditionally been a major cause of blindness in the less developed countries in the region, and although the volume and quality of cataract surgeries have improved, the cataract surgery rate remains low for some of these countries.

The cost of cataract surgery in Asia depends on the type of procedure, whether it is provided privately or by government hospital, whether it is provided in day care or in patient surgery, and on the economic status of people in the region.  Phaco surgery is more expensive than ECCE and MSICS, and visual outcomes are variable, depending on the surgical techniques and lens implants used.

China
The cataracts are common in China, with the overall prevalence in 2022 in Chinese people over 50 years old found to be 27.45%  This was split by environment, with rural prevalence at 28.79%, and urban prevalence at 26.66%.  Prevalence of cataract varies considerably by age group. From ages 50 to 59 it is 7.88%, from 60 to 69 it is 24.94%, from 70 to 79 it is 51.74%, and over 80 years old it is 78.43%. The overall cataract surgery coverage rate was 9.19%. The prevalence of cataract and cataract surgical coverage also has significant variation by region.

India
India has raised its cataract surgical rate from just over 700 operations per million people per year in 1981, to 6,000 per million per year in 2011, which is much closer to the estimated rate of 8,000 to 8,700 per million per year needed to eliminate blindness due to cataracts in India. This is partly a combined result of increased efficiency due to improved surgical technique, with surgeons able to do twenty operations per day, application of day case surgery, improvements in operating theatre design, and efficient team work with sufficient staff.

The other aspect is that people apply for surgery in large numbers. This has been achieved by creating a demand for cataract surgery in the community. Social marketing methods were used to make the population more aware of cataracts and that they are a common age-related problem that can be treated effectively at affordable cost. The NGO sector and Indian ophthalmologists have developed methods to deal with local problems, including outreach camps to find those needing surgery, counselors to explain the system, locally manufactured equipment and consumables and a tiered pricing structure, using subsidies where appropriate.

There have been occasional public scandals when multiple patients have been infected and developed endophthalmitis on the same day at some hospitals associated with eye camps in India. Journalists have reported blame being placed on the surgeons, the hospital administration, and other persons, but have not reported on who was responsible for sterilisation of the surgical instruments and theatres involved, whether all infections involved the same micro-organisms, the same theatres, or the same staff. One investigation found bacteria known to be associated with endophthalmia  present in the theatre and in the eyes of affected patients, and it was claimed that the hospital had not followed the required protocol for infection control, but the investigation was ongoing. Several instances of surgeons performing more operations per day than officially allowed have also been reported, but it has not been made clear how this could affect sterility of equipment, or how it might plausibly cause infection.

In 2022 the digital news publication Scroll.in requested information on the numbers of patients who had contracted such infections from the central health ministry and were informed that since 2006, 469 people had either been blinded in one eye or had their vision seriously affected after undergoing surgery at eye camps. Further inquiries indicated that the number was at least 519, but the total number of surgeries for that period was not mentioned. Since the number of eye surgeries performed in India is large – as of 2017, India is claimed to be doing about 6.5 million cataract surgeries per year – more than the US, Europe and China put together – this is a very small percentage.

Africa

Cataracts are the main cause of blindness in Africa, and affect approximately half of the estimated seven million blind people on the continent, a number which is expected to expand with population growth by about 600,000 people per year. The cataract surgery rate is about 500 per million per year as of 2005. Progress has been made on gathering information on epidemiology, distribution and impact of cataracts within Africa, but significant barriers and challenges remain.

These barriers are variously reported as relating to awareness, acceptance and cost, and some studies reported community and family dynamics as barriers. Cataract surgical rate was reported as lower in females in the majority of studies. The higher cataract surgical coverage found in some settings in South Africa, Libya, and Kenya suggest that many barriers to surgery can be overcome.

According to the International Agency for the Prevention of Blindness there is only about one ophthalmologist per million people in some sub-Saharan countries, and according to the National Center for Biotechnology Information the percentage of adults above the age of 50 in western sub-Saharan Africa who are blind because of cataracts is about 6% – the highest rate in the world.

A mathematical model using survey data from sub-Saharan Africa shows that the incidence of cataracts varies significantly across the continent, and therefore that the required rate of surgery to maintain a visual acuity level of 6/18 (20/60) varies significantly from about 1200 to about 4500 surgeries per year per million people. This variation may relate to genetic or cultural differences, and to life expectancy.

Nigeria
As of 2011, 0.78% of the population of Nigeria are blind. More than 43% of these are blind from cataracts and another 9% from aphakia and complications from couching performed by itinerant practitioners. There are about 2.8 ophthalmologists per million population in Nigeria, but the cataract surgical rate is only 300 per million per year, as opposed to the WHO recommendation of 3000 per million per year. Reasons cited for this situation include inadequate blindness prevention programs, lack of political will, shortage of funding, and failure of the government to take responsibility for training and services. Teaching hospitals do not have enough patient surgical load to support training.

South Africa
Facilities vary from government hospitals where subsidised operations for the disadvantaged may be charged at rates that cover the consumables, to private clinics where state of the art equipment is used and charged at premium rates. Waiting times in government hospitals may be up to two years, but are much shorter at private clinics. An innovation increasing efficient use of facilities is used in some hospitals where two patients are operated on for cataracts in the theatre at the same time. There are also charitable organisations which provide pro bono cataract surgery in rural areas using mobile clinics.

As of 2023 the cataract surgery rate in South Africa is less than half of the estimated requirement of at least 2000 per million population per year needed to eliminate cataract blindness. Problems identified by Lecuona and Cook in 2011 include inadequate human resources available to the public sector to provide care for the indigent population. The main barrier to increasing the rate of surgery in South Africa is inadequate surgery capacity. A higher annual rate of cataract surgeries by individual surgeons would improve cost effectiveness and personal skills, and also contribute towards a overall reduction of risk.

Latin America 

A four-year longitudinal study of 19 Latin-America countries published in 2010 showed that most of the countries increased their surgery rates over that period, with increases of up to 186%, but still fell significantly short of adequate surgical coverage. There is a good correlation between gross national income per capita and cataract surgery rate over the countries involved.

In a study published in 2014 the weighted mean regional surgery rate was found to have increased by 70% over the period from 2005 to 2012, from 1562 to 2672 cataract surgeries per million inhabitants. The weighted mean number of ophthalmologists per 1 million inhabitants in the region is approximately 62. Cataract surgery coverage varies widely in Latin America, from only 15% in El Salvador to a more satisfactory 77% in Uruguay. Barriers cited include cost of surgery and lack of awareness of the surgical treatment option. The available numbers of ophthalmologists appear to be adequate, but it is not known how many actually perform surgery.

In a third study, published in 2009, the prevalence of cataract blindness in people 50 years and older ranged from 0.5% in Buenos Aires to 2.3% in parts of Guatemala. Poor vision due to cataracts ranged from 0.9% in Buenos Aires to 10.7% in parts of Peru. Cataract surgical coverage ranged from good in parts of Brazil to poor in Paraguay, Peru, and Guatemala. Visual outcome after cataract surgery was close to conformity with World Health Organization (WHO) guidelines in Buenos Aires, where more than 80% of post-surgery eyes had visual acuity of 6/18 (20/60) or better, but ranged between 60% and 79% in most of the other regions, and was worse than 60% in Guatemala and Peru.

Society and culture

The 1998 World Health Report published an estimate of 19.34 million people who are bilaterally blind due to age-related cataracts, which was 43% of all causes of blindness. This number and proportion were expected to increase due to population growth and increased life expectancy approximately doubling the population in the over 60 years age group. The global increase in blindness from cataract is estimated to be at least 5 million per year, and a figure of 1000 new cases per million population per year is used for planning purposes. The average outcomes of cataract surgery are improving over time, and consequently the stage at which surgery is indicated is becoming earlier, which also increases the number of operable cases. It is necessary to operate on more eyes per year than the new cases alone to reduce the backlog.

The rate of surgeries in the economically developed countries as of 1998 was about 4000 to 6000 per million population per year, which was sufficient to meet the demand. India raised the CSR to over 3000, but this does not seem to be sufficient to reduce the backlog. The middle income countries of Latin America and Asia have CSRs of between 500 and 2000 per million per year, and China, most of Africa and the poorer countries of Asia had rates of less than 500. In India and South East Asia the rate required to keep up with the increase is at least 3000 per million population per year, and in Africa and other parts of the word with smaller percentages of older people, a rate of 2000 may be sufficient for the short term.

Vision 2020: The Right to Sight was a global initiative of the International Agency for the Prevention of Blindness (IAPB). The project was intended to eliminate or reduce the main causes of avoidable blindness throughout the world by the year 2020. Programs instituted under Vision 2020 facilitated the planning, development, and implementation of sustainable national eye care programs, including technical support and advocacy. The program was launched on 18 February 1999 by the International Agency for the Prevention of Blindness and the World Health Organization.

The Vision 2020 initiative succeeded in bringing the issue of avoidable blindness to the global health agenda. The causes have not been eliminated, but there have been significant changes to the distribution of the causes, which can be attributed to global demographic shifts. Remaining challenges to management of avoidable blindness include population size, gender disparities in access to eyecare, and the available professional workforce.

It has been estimated that there were 43.3 million blind people in 2020, and 295 million with moderate and severe visual impairment (MSVI), 55% female. The age-standardised global prevalence in blindness decreased by 28.5% between 1990 and 2020, but the age-standardised prevalence of MSVI increased by 2.5%. The global leading cause of blindness in 2020 remained cataract.

Special populations

Congenital cataracts

Congenital cataracts are a lens opacity which is present at birth. They occur in a broad range of severity: some lens opacities do not progress and are visually insignificant, others can produce profound visual impairment. Congenital cataracts may be unilateral or bilateral. They can be classified by morphology, presumed or defined genetic cause, presence of specific metabolic disorders, or associated ocular anomalies or systemic findings.

In general, the younger the child, the greater the urgency in removing a dense cataract, because of the risk of amblyopia. For optimal visual development in newborns and young infants, a visually significant unilateral congenital cataract should be detected and removed before age six weeks, and visually significant bilateral congenital cataracts should be removed before age 10 weeks.

Some congenital cataracts are too small to affect vision, therefore no surgery or treatment will be done. If they are superficial and small, an ophthalmologist will continue to monitor them throughout a patient's life. Commonly, a patient with small congenital cataracts that do not affect vision will eventually be affected later in life; generally this will take decades to occur.

The standard of care as of 2015 for pediatric cataract surgery for children older than two years is primary posterior intraocular lens implantation. Primary IOL implantation before age seven months is considered to have no advantages over aphakia. A 2015 study suggests that primary IOL implantation in the seven month to two years old age groups should be considered in children who require cataract surgery.

Research into the possibility of regeneration of infant lenses from lens epithelial cells has shown interesting results in a small trial study reported in 2016.

Developing world
The capital equipment for phacoemulsification is expensive and requires expert maintenance, and the consumables are also expensive. Quality of outcomes is not sufficiently better than outcomes for manual small incision cataract surgery (MSICS) to justify the difference in cost in a developing world environment.

Higher risk for operations on separate occasions
Most patients have bilateral cataracts and although surgery in one eye can restore functional vision, second eye surgery has many advantages, so most patients undergo surgery in both eyes but on separate days. Operating on both eyes on the same day as separate procedures is known as immediately sequential bilateral cataract surgery. This can decrease the number of hospital visits which reduces risk of contagion in an epidemic. There are also significant cost savings and faster visual rehabilitation and neuroadaptation. Another indication is significant cataract in both eyes where the person is not a good candidate for having anaesthesia and surgery twice. The risk of simultaneous bilateral complications is low.

See also

Notes

References

Further reading

External links 

Youtube video of phacoemulification technique

Eye surgery
Human eye anatomy
Lenses